Jan Jindra (6 March 1932 – 20 September 2021) was a Czech rower who competed for Czechoslovakia in the 1952 Summer Olympics, in the 1956 Summer Olympics, and in the 1960 Summer Olympics.

He was born in Třeboň. In 1952 he was a crew member of the Czechoslovak boat which won the gold medal in the coxed fours event. Four years later he was part of the Czechoslovak boat which was eliminated in the semi-final of the eight competition. At the 1960 Games he won the bronze medal with the Czechoslovak boat in the eights event.

References

External links
 profile

1932 births
2021 deaths
Czech male rowers
Czechoslovak male rowers
Olympic rowers of Czechoslovakia
Rowers at the 1952 Summer Olympics
Rowers at the 1956 Summer Olympics
Rowers at the 1960 Summer Olympics
Olympic gold medalists for Czechoslovakia
Olympic bronze medalists for Czechoslovakia
Olympic medalists in rowing
Medalists at the 1960 Summer Olympics
Medalists at the 1952 Summer Olympics
People from Třeboň
European Rowing Championships medalists
Sportspeople from the South Bohemian Region